Francis Higgins was an 18th-century Anglican clergyman.

Dassy was born in Limerick and educated at Trinity College, Dublin.  He was incorporated at Oxford in 1706.  A prebendary of Christ Church Cathedral, Dublin, he was Archdeacon of Cashel from 1725  until 1728.

References 

18th-century Irish Anglican priests
Archdeacons of Cashel
People from Anglesey
Alumni of Trinity College Dublin